Sergio Bonaldi (born 7 September 1978) is an Italian former biathlete. He competed in the men's sprint event at the 2006 Winter Olympics.

References

External links
 

1978 births
Living people
Italian male biathletes
Olympic biathletes of Italy
Biathletes at the 2006 Winter Olympics
Sportspeople from the Province of Bergamo